Burkina Faso competed in the 2003 All-Africa Games held at the National Stadium in the city of Abuja, Nigeria. A team from Burkina Faso had competed at the Games since the first All-Africa Games in 1965, initially competing under its then name of Upper Volta. In 2003, the team competed in sixteen events and brought back three bronze medals.

Competitors
Burkina Faso first entered the All-Africa Games in 1965 at the inaurgual Games, competing as Upper Volta. In 2003, Burkina Faso entered sixteen events, eleven in the men’s events and five for
women. The country was particularly well represented in athletics with ten competitors entering numerous track and field events, including the men’s and women’s 100 metres and triple jump.

Medal summary
Burkina Faso won three bronze medals and was ranked joint thirty-first in the medal table.

Medal table

List of Medalists

Bronze Medal

References

2003 in Burkinabé sport
2003